This is the list of poets which is raised from the Budh Sabha, a literary workshop for Gujarati poetry in Ahmedabad.

List 
 Adil Mansuri
 Anil Chavda
 Ankit Trivedi
 Ashok Chavda
 Balmukund Dave
 Bhavesh Bhatt
 Chandrakant Sheth
 Chinu Modi
 Dhiru Parikh
 Hardwar Goswami
 Harshad Trivedi
 Labhshankar Thakar
 Madhav Ramanuj
 Manhar Modi
 Niranjan Bhagat
 Pravin Pandya
 Priyakant Maniar
 Radheshyam Sharma
 Raghuveer Chaudhari
 Rajendra Shah
 Rajendra Shukla
 Rajesh Vyas
 Ravji Patel
 Sundaram
 Umashankar Joshi
 Venibhai Purohit
 Yogesh Joshi
 Yoseph Macwan

See also
 List of Gujarati-language writers

References

Gujarati literature